The Direct Fly ArGO is a Czech ultralight and light-sport aircraft, designed and produced by Direct Fly sro of Hluk, introduced at the Blois fly-in show in France, in 2011. When it was available the aircraft was supplied complete and ready-to-fly.

Design and development
The ArGO was designed to comply with the Fédération Aéronautique Internationale (FAI) microlight rules and US light-sport aircraft (LSA) rules, with different versions at different gross weights for each category. It features a strut-braced high-wing, an enclosed cabin with two-seats-in-side-by-side configuration accessed by doors, fixed tricycle landing gear and a single engine in tractor configuration.

The aircraft fuselage is made from welded steel tubing covered in aluminum sheet. The flying surfaces are made from aluminum sheet. Standard engines available are the  Rotax 912UL and the  Rotax 912ULS four-stroke powerplants.

As of February 2017, the design does not appear on the Federal Aviation Administration's list of approved special light-sport aircraft.

Variants
arGO ULL
arGO LSA/ELSA

Specifications (ArGO ULL)

References

External links
Official website

ArGO
2010s Czech ultralight aircraft
Light-sport aircraft
Single-engined tractor aircraft